Divinyl sulfide is the organosulfur compound with the formula S(CH=CH2)2.  A colorless liquid with a faint odor, it is found in some species of Allium.

It is notable as the product from hydrogen sulfide and acetylene, a combination that arises when acetylene is generated by hydrolysis of technical-grade calcium carbide, which contains impurities of calcium sulfide.

Divinylsulfide was first prepared in 1920 by the reaction of bis(2-chloroethyl)sulfide with sodium ethoxide:
(ClCH2CH2)2S  +  2 NaOEt   →  (CH2=CH)2S  +  2 EtOH  +  2 NaCl

Monovinyl sulfides
With the formula CH2=CHSR, a variety of monovinyl sulfides are known.  They often arise  by the dehydrohalogenation of -2-haloethyl phenyl sulfides.  One example is phenyl vinyl sulfide.

References

Thioethers
Vinyl compounds